Majstori, majstori is a 1980 Yugoslav comedy film directed by Goran Marković. It has since become a classic of Serbian cinema. It was digitally restored for its 40th anniversary in a joint effort by the Yugoslav Film Archive and Vip mobile.

Cast 
 Semka Sokolović-Bertok - Direktorka skole
 Bogdan Diklić - Inspektor Simic
 Snežana Nikšić - Gordana
 Predrag Laković - Bogdan
 Tanja Bošković - Bosa 
 Milivoje Tomić - Vuksan 
 Olivera Marković - Kristina
 Zoran Radmilović - Sava
 Pavle Vuisić - Stole
 Aleksandar Berček - Djoka 'Viski'
 Stojan Dečermić - Cira 'Emanuela'
 Miodrag Andrić - Silja
 Mirjana Karanović - Dunja
 Rade Marković - Miloje

References

External links 

1980 comedy films
1980 films
Yugoslav comedy films
Films set in Belgrade      
Films shot in Belgrade 
Films set in Yugoslavia